Thorvald is from the Old Norse name Þórvaldr, which means "Thor's ruler". Despite this pagan origin, the name survived the conversion of Scandinavians to Christianity and remains popular up to the present.

Thorvald may refer to:

Thorvald Aagaard (1877–1937), Danish composer, organist and college teacher
Thorvald Astrup (1876–1940), Norwegian architect, known for industrial architecture
Thorvald Asvaldsson, father of the colonizer of Greenland, Erik the Red (Eiríkr Rauði)
Thorwald Bergquist (1899–1972), Swedish politician
Thorvald Bindesbøll (1846–1908), Danish architect and designer
Thorvald Eigenbrod (1892–1977), Danish field hockey player
Thorvald Ellegaard (1877–1954), Danish track racing cyclist
Thorvald Eriksson, son of Eric the Red and brother of Leif Ericsson
Thorvald Hansen, Norwegian Nordic combined skier
Thorvald Hedgehog (2000-2016), the world's oldest European hedgehog
Thorvald Jørgensen (June 1867 – 1946), Danish architect
Thorvald Lammers (1841–1922), Norwegian baritone singer, conductor, composer and biographer
Thorvald Mejdell (1824–1908), Norwegian forester
Glør Thorvald Mejdell (1851–1937), Norwegian barrister, judge and political writer
Thorvald Mellingen (born 1935), Norwegian engineer
Thorvald Meyer (1818–1909), Norwegian businessman in real estate development in Oslo, and forestry
Thorvald Olsen (1889–1938), Norwegian wrestler and sports official
Thorvald Sørensen (1902–1973), Danish botanist and evolutionary biologist
Thorvald Solberg (1852–1949), the first Register of Copyrights (1897–1930) in the United States Copyright Office
Thorvald Stauning (1873–1942), first social democratic Prime Minister of Denmark
Thorvald Steen (born 1954), Norwegian writer
Thorvald Stoltenberg (born 1931), prominent Norwegian politician
Thorvald Strömberg (1931–2010), Finnish flatwater canoeist
Thorvald N. Thiele (1838–1910), Danish astronomer, actuary and mathematician
Thorvald Thronsen (1917–2003), Norwegian paramilitary officer
Thorvald Wilhelmsen (1912–1996), Norwegian long-distance runner
Thorvald the Red, a fictional Viking on the TV series Fanboy & Chum Chum
Jürgen Thorwald  (1915–2006) a German writer, journalist and historian
Turoldus, a variant of "Thorvald", was the traditional name of the author of the medieval Chanson de Roland (also Théroulde, Troude, Théroude, Thouroude)

See also
Torvald (disambiguation)
Torvalds
Þorvaldur

References 

Danish masculine given names
Norwegian masculine given names
Scandinavian masculine given names

de:Thorwald